Kanokwan Krittakom (born 1 November 1962) is a Thai sports shooter. She competed in the women's 10 metre air rifle event at the 1984 Summer Olympics.

References

External links
 

1962 births
Living people
Kanokwan Krittakom
Kanokwan Krittakom
Shooters at the 1984 Summer Olympics
Place of birth missing (living people)
Shooters at the 1994 Asian Games
Kanokwan Krittakom
Kanokwan Krittakom